The Art Renewal Center (ARC) is a non-profit, educational organization, which hosts an online museum dedicated to realist art. The ARC was founded by New Jersey businessman, author, and art collector Fred Ross.

Particular emphasis is given to nineteenth-century Salon painting. William-Adolphe Bouguereau is represented by more than 226 images on the site; Ross says that Bouguereau's work is accessed twice as often as any other artist on the site.

Purpose 
The Art Renewal Center is devoted to the rehabilitation of late nineteenth-century academic painting. The Art Renewal Centre offers a scholarship program, as well as an annual salon competition in order to promote classical realism.  Ross places an emphasis on William Bouguereau, and has written books about him, such as "William Bouguereau: His Life and Works". Ross feels that there has been a "concerted and relentless effort to disparage, denigrate and obliterate the reputations, names and brilliance of the academic artistic masters of the late 19th century." The Art Renewal Center is intended as a platform for Ross and his supporters to "extol the virtues of academic artists and castigate nearly everything associated with modern art." The ARC describes itself as offering "responsible views opposing that of the current art establishment".

Ross is a strong admirer of Adolphe Bouguereau's work. In 2002 he spoke to the New York Society of Portrait Artists and described the impression made on him in the Clark Art Institute by Bouguereau's  painting, Nymphs and Satyr:
Frozen in place, gawking with my mouth agape, cold chills careening up and down my spine, I was virtually gripped as if by a spell that had been cast. Years of undergraduate courses and another 60 credits post-graduate in art, and I had never heard [Bouguereau's] name. Who was he? Was he important? Anyone who could have done this must surely be deserving of the highest accolades in the art world.

Online art museum
The Art Renewal Center has an online digital art gallery that includes an extensive catalogue of high resolution images of drawings, sculptures, and paintings. This database of images have been provided for use in art history books, magazines, and newspapers.

References

Further reading 
 Ross, Fred. The Philosophy of ARC: Why Realism?.

External links

 

Virtual art museums and galleries
Arts organizations established in 2000
2000 establishments in New Jersey